Nina Meinke (born 4 March 1993) is a German professional boxer. She has held the European female featherweight title since 2018 and previously the WIBF featherweight title in 2018.

Professional boxing record

References

External links

Living people
1993 births
German women boxers
Boxers from Berlin
Featherweight boxers
Super-featherweight boxers
Lightweight boxers
European Boxing Union champions
World boxing champions
Southpaw boxers